Miss Grand Honduras is an annual female national beauty pageant in Honduras, founded in 2022 by a chairperson of AV Productions, Amelia Vega. The winner represents the country at its parent contest Miss Grand International. Previously in 2013 to 2015, the license belonged to the Miss Honduras organization.

Honduras participated in the Miss Grand International pageant four times in 2013, 2015, 2021, and 2022, but only qualified for the semi-final round once in 2022. The reigning Miss Grand Honduras is Saira Cacho of Colón Department who was crowned on 10 July 2022 at La Galería in Tegucigalpa, she will represent Honduras in Miss Grand International 2022.

Background

History
Honduras participated at Miss Grand International for the first time in 2013, represented by former Miss Honduras 2013 Nelly Reyes, who was appointed by the Miss Honduras organization which franchised the license for 2013 and 2015. However, no Honduran licensee for Miss Grand International from 2016 to 2020, but after such the hiatus, former Miss International Queen Honduras, Amelia Vega, acquired the license in 2021 and subsequently appointed , Miss Honduras 2017, to participate in that year's edition in Thailand. Moreover, under her directorship, an inaugural edition of Miss Grand Honduras also happen in the following year, aiming to determine country representatives for the Miss Grand International 2022 and 2023. The contest featured eighteen finalists represented eighteen country departments, of which Saira Cacho of Colón was elected the main winner, while Britthany Marroquin of Copán was named the 2023 titleholder.

Edition
The following list is the edition detail of the Miss Grand Honduras contest, since its inception in 2022.

Selection of contestants
In its first edition, the national finalists were directly chosen by the central licensee through an online application then the qualified candidates were later assigned to represent one of the 18 country's administrative departments.

Titleholders

Gallery

National finalists
The following list is the national finalists of the Miss Grand Honduras pageant, as well as the competition results.
Color keys
 Declared as the winner
 Ended as a runner-up 
 Ended as a semifinalist 
 Ended as a Quaterfinalist 
 Withdrew
 Did not participate

References

External links

 Miss Grand Honduras official website

Honduras
Recurring events established in 2022